The Magician's Birthday is the fifth album by British rock band Uriah Heep, released in November 1972 by Bronze Records in the UK and Mercury Records in the US. The concept was "based loosely on a short story" written by keyboardist Ken Hensley in June and July 1972.

The original vinyl release was a gatefold sleeve, the front designed again by Roger Dean. The inner fold had pictures of the band, with the album itself housed in a liner on which were printed the lyrics.

The single "Sweet Lorraine" / "Blind Eye" reached No. 91 in the US Hot 100 chart. The single "Spider Woman" reached No. 14 in Germany. The Magician's Birthday was certified gold by the RIAA on 22 January 1973.

The album was remastered and reissued by Castle Communications in 1996 with two bonus tracks, and again in 2003 in an expanded deluxe edition. In 2017, Sanctuary Records released a two-disc version.

Reception

The Magician's Birthday received mixed reviews from contemporary critics. Mike Saunders, writing for Creem, called the album "a package full of dreck", finding the first side of the LP "listenable" despite poor production and side two downright "irritating". Village Voice critic Robert Christgau described the songs on the album as "third-hand heavy metal fantasies (...) hooked to some clean, powerful arrangements, and a good melody or two."

Modern reviews are more positive. AllMusic reviewer remarked the album's prog elements and wrote that "The Magician's Birthday never quite hits the consistent heights of Look at Yourself or Demons and Wizards, but remains a solid listen for Uriah Heep fans". Joe Geesein of Record Collector praised the musicians and the good sound of the album's reissue, but wrote that most of the songs "don't stand up quite out so well" in comparison with opener "Sunrise" or the single "Spider Woman". Canadian journalist Martin Popoff called The Magician's Birthday "another colourful, mystical journey", although "somewhat disjointed, less accessible and in total much less metallic" than previous efforts, "culminating in the band's most harrowing, nightmarish epic of them all, the ten minute title track."

Track listings

Personnel 
Credits adapted from album liner notes
Uriah Heep
 David Byron – vocals
 Mick Box – guitars
 Ken Hensley – keyboards, guitars, Moog synthesizer
 Lee Kerslake – drums, percussion
 Gary Thain – bass guitar

Additional musician
 Brian Cole – pedal steel guitar on "Tales"

Production
 Gerry Bron – producer
 Peter Gallen – engineer
 Ashley Howe – assistant engineer
 Gilbert Kong – mastering
 Mike Brown and Robert Corich – remastering (1996 and 2003 reissues)

Charts

Album

Weekly charts

Year-end charts

Singles

Certifications

References 

1972 albums
Uriah Heep (band) albums
Albums with cover art by Roger Dean (artist)
Albums produced by Gerry Bron
Bronze Records albums
Mercury Records albums